The discography of German singer and songwriter Michael Schulte consists of six studio albums and thirteen singles.

Albums

Studio albums

Compilation albums

Live albums

Extended plays

Singles

As lead artist

As featured artist

Promotional singles

References

Discographies of German artists